Michael Horus Hall (born June 5, 1984) is an American-Irish former professional basketball player and current coach.

College career
He attended Alan B. Shepard High School in Palos Heights, Illinois. Hall, a four-year starter at George Washington University from 2002 through 2006 was a tri-captain his senior season on a team that went 27–3. Those Colonial teams won the Atlantic 10 Conference in 2005 and made the NCAA tournament in 2005 and 2006. Hall was inducted into George Washington's Athletics Hall of Fame in 2019.

Professional career
Undrafted after his senior season, Hall joined the Tulsa 66ers of the NBA Development League. On February 28, 2007, the Washington Wizards signed him to a ten-day contract due to injuries of forwards Antawn Jamison and Caron Butler. He was signed to a second ten-day contract shortly afterwards, and on March 21, the team signed him for the rest of the season.
He appeared in two games for the Wizards and was released in late October, 2007 due to salary cap reasons.

On August 11, 2008, Hall signed with Armani Jeans Milano of the Lega Basket Serie A, the top level of Italian basketball. In the 2008–09 season, Hall was one of the top rebounders of Serie A. Thanks also to his good performances, Armani Jeans reached Euroleague 2008-09 Top 16 and Serie A finals, which they eventually lost to Montepaschi Siena. In the 2008–09. he scored career highs 27 points and 9 rebounds in Euroleague, and 23 points and 15 rebounds in Serie A.

In August 2010, Hall signed a contract with Bancatercas Teramo, but was released in December 2010 after the team's 0–5 start. On December 16, 2010, he was acquired by the Dakota Wizards of the NBA Development League. In January 2011, he moved to Turkey and signed with Erdemir SK. At the end of the season, he left Erdemir.

In January 2012, he signed with Fuenlabrada of Spain for the rest of the season. On November 29, 2012, he signed with Maccabi Ashdod of Israel. In his second game with Maccabi, he got injured and missed the rest of the season.

On March 26, 2014, he signed with Toros de Aragua of the Venezuelan Liga Profesional de Baloncesto.

In September 2014, Hall signed with La Bruixa d'Or Manresa of Spain. In October 2014, he parted ways with Manresa, after playing only two games. On November 26, 2014, he signed with Juventud Sionista of Argentina. He left Sionista after only three games. On February 24, 2015, he signed with Aries Trikala of the Greek Basket League. On April 17, 2015, he left Trikala and signed with Scaligera Verona of the Italian Serie A2 Basket for the rest of the season.

On October 28, 2015, Hall signed with Pallacanestro Biella of the Italian Serie A2 Basket.

On October 20, 2021, Hall announced his retirement from professional basketball.

Coaching 

In 2021, Hall joined the New York Knicks organization as a coach, coaching with the Westchester Knicks as the Player Development Manager.

Career statistics

Italian League 

|-
| align="left" | 2008–09
| align="left" | Milano
| 42 || 41 || 30.1 || .429 || .335 || .745 || 7.6 || 1.1 || 2.0 || .3 || 11.0
|-
| align="left" | 2009–10
| align="left" | Milano
| 39 || 25 || 25.8 || .363 || .284 || .778 || 6.2 || 1.6 || 1.3 || .4 || 7.1
|-
| align="left" | 2010–11
| align="left" | Teramo
| 5 || 5 || 37.6 || .375 || .348 || .833 || 8.2 || 1.8 || 1.8 || .2 || 10.8
|-
| align="left" | Career
| align="left" | 
| 86 || 71 || 28.6 || .400 || .315 || .763 || 7.0 || 1.3 || 1.7 || .3 || 9.3

References

External links
 Mike Hall at FIBA.com
 Mike Hall at Euroleague.net
 Mike Hall at RealGM.com
 

1984 births
Living people
African-American basketball players
American expatriate basketball people in Argentina
American expatriate basketball people in Greece
American expatriate basketball people in Israel
American expatriate basketball people in Italy
American expatriate basketball people in Spain
American expatriate basketball people in Turkey
American expatriate basketball people in Venezuela
Aries Trikala B.C. players
Baloncesto Fuenlabrada players
Basketball players from Chicago
Bàsquet Manresa players
Dakota Wizards players
George Washington Colonials men's basketball players
Liga ACB players
Maccabi Ashdod B.C. players
Olimpia Milano players
People from Palos Heights, Illinois
Small forwards
Teramo Basket players
Tulsa 66ers players
Undrafted National Basketball Association players
Washington Wizards players
American men's basketball players